Falak od Din (also Romanized as Falak od Dīn and Falaked Dīn) is a village in Hemmatabad Rural District, in the Central District of Borujerd County, Lorestan Province, Iran. At the 2006 census, its population was 2,453, in 604 families.

References 

Towns and villages in Borujerd County